The AIM-97 Seekbat or XAIM-97A Seek Bat was a long-range air-to-air missile developed by the United States. It was intended to counter the perceived capabilities of the Mikoyan-Gurevich MiG-25 and proposed to arm both the F-15 Eagle and F-4 Phantom, the missile ultimately never entered service.

Overview
In the early to mid-1970s the United States was highly concerned by the perceived capabilities of the MiG-25, an aircraft which was known to be capable of speeds in excess of Mach 3 and which carried long-range air-to-air missiles. It was widely claimed that the Foxbat was a new generation "super-fighter", capable of comfortably outclassing any US or allied aircraft. The US initiated the F-15 Eagle program largely in response to this threat. To equip the F-15 the Air Force initiated development of the AIM-82 short-range missile and the AIM-97 Seekbat. The former was a dogfighting missile intended as a replacement for the AIM-9 Sidewinder, the latter was to be a new high-altitude long-range missile designed specifically to shoot down the MiG-25 - hence the name "Seekbat", the "bat" referring to the MiG-25's "Foxbat" NATO reporting name.

The Seekbat was based on the AGM-78 Standard ARM. It had a larger  propulsion unit and used semi-active radar homing with an infrared seeker for terminal guidance of the missile.

Test firings began in late 1972,  but the Seekbat program did not make a great deal of progress and was cancelled in 1976.  By this time new knowledge of the MiG-25s capabilities and role led to the cancellation of the program because the missile's cost did not justify its procurement.

See also
Brazo
R-27 (air-to-air missile)

References
Notes

Bibliography
 
 
 
 
 

General Dynamics
Proposed weapons of the United States
Cold War air-to-air missiles of the United States
Abandoned military rocket and missile projects of the United States